William Hunter may refer to:

Politicians

U.S. politicians
 William Hunter (Vermont politician) (1754–1827), U.S. Representative from Vermont
 William Hunter (senator) (1774–1849), U.S. Senator from Rhode Island
 William H. Hunter (died 1842), U.S. Representative from Ohio
 William Hunter (Assistant Secretary of State) (1805–1886), U.S. Assistant Secretary of State; Rhode Island politician
 William F. Hunter (1808–1874), lawyer and U.S. Representative from Ohio

Other politicians
 William Hunter (Aberdeen MP) (1844–1898), Scottish politician
 William Hunter, Lord Hunter (1865–1957), Scottish politician and judge
 William Hunter (Canadian politician) (1858–1939), businessman and politician in British Columbia

Sports
 Will Hunter (born 1979), American football safety
 William Hunter (American athlete) (1883–1966), American Olympic athlete
 William Hunter (British athlete) (1892–1974), British Olympic athlete
 William Hunter (footballer, born 1888) (1888–1949), English footballer
 William Hunter (golfer) (c. 1850–?), Scottish amateur golfer
 Willie Hunter (American football), American football player and coach 
 Willie Hunter (footballer, born 1940) (1940–2020), Scottish football player and manager
 Willie Hunter (footballer, born 1880) (fl. 1900s), Scottish footballer
 Willie Hunter (golfer) (1892–1968), Scottish-American professional golfer

Other people
 William Hunter (merchant), 16th-century Scottish merchant and spy
 William Hunter (anatomist) (1718–1783), Scottish anatomist
 William Hunter (surgeon) (1861–1937), British surgeon known for his oral sepsis theory
 William Hunter (Asiatic Society) (1755–1812), official and minister in India
 William Hunter (martyr) (c. 1530–1555), Protestant martyr
 Joseph Bradford (playwright) (William Randolph Hunter, 1843–1886), American playwright
 William Wilson Hunter (1840–1900), British historian
 William Hunter (statistician) (1937–1986), statistician
 William Guyer Hunter (1829–1902), surgeon-general in India, principal of medical colleges and Conservative politician
 William Hunter (publisher) (died 1761), printer and publisher in colonial America
 William Magee Hunter (1834–1868), New Zealand soldier
 Willie Hunter (musician) (1933–1995), Scottish folk fiddler

See also
 Bill Hunter (disambiguation)